The 2000 Trophée Lalique was the fifth event of six in the 2000–01 ISU Grand Prix of Figure Skating, a senior-level international invitational competition series. It was held at the Palais Omnisports de Paris-Bercy in Paris on November 23–26. Medals were awarded in the disciplines of men's singles, ladies' singles, pair skating, and ice dancing. Skaters earned points toward qualifying for the 2000–01 Grand Prix Final.

The competition was named after the Lalique company, which was its chief sponsor at the time.

Results

Men

Ladies

Pairs

Ice dancing

External links
 2000 Trophée Lalique

Trophée Lalique, 2000
Internationaux de France
Trophée Lalique
Trophée Lalique
Trophée Lalique
Figure skating in Paris
International figure skating competitions hosted by France